South Arm is a rural residential locality in the local government area of Clarence in the Hobart region of Tasmania. The 2016 census has a population of 880 for the state suburb of South Arm.

History
South Arm was gazetted as a locality in 1967.

South Arm Post Office opened on 6 February 1856.

Geography
The Derwent River forms the western boundary, and Storm Bay the southern. Ralphs Bay forms most of the northern boundary.

The locality is located on the South Arm Peninsula on the outskirts of the greater Hobart area in Tasmania.

Road infrastructure
The B33 route (South Arm Road) enters from the south-east and runs through to the north-west, where it exits.

References

Sources
(Google Maps)

South Arm Peninsula
Localities of City of Clarence
Towns in Tasmania